Georgi Slavov Karaslavov (12 January 1904 – 26 January 1980) was a Bulgarian writer born in the Debar district of the town of Parvomay in Plovdiv Province.  Several of his novels, including Snaha, Tatul, and Selkor, were made into films.

Biography 
Georgi Karaslavov was born in 1904 in Parvomay. After he graduates from the high school in 1922, he moved to live in Sofia, and study in the Postal School. In 1923, he studied in a pedagogical school in Harmanli and continued his education by moving to Kazanlak. He took part in the September Uprising. Afterward, he signed up and graduated from Sofia University in 1928.

Because of his short novel named "Selkor", he was sentenced and imprisoned by the anti-communist regime in Bulgaria at the time.

Between 1947 and 1949 Georgi Karaslavov was the director of the Ivan Vazov National Theater.

Honors
A school in Sofia is named for Karaslavov, and there is a bust of Karaslavov in the park behind Vasil Levski National Stadium in Sofia. A full size statue of Karaslavov has been placed in the town of Parvomay.

References

1904 births
1980 deaths
Bulgarian writers
People from Parvomay
Members of the Bulgarian Academy of Sciences